Boxley is an unincorporated community in Adams Township, Hamilton County, Indiana.

History
Boxley was laid out in 1836 by Addison and Thomas P. Boxley. The first store in Adams Township, and the first post office, were established in Boxley. The post office at Boxley was established in 1837, and remained in operation until it was discontinued in 1907.

Geography

References

Unincorporated communities in Hamilton County, Indiana
Unincorporated communities in Indiana
Indianapolis metropolitan area